Raúl Córdoba Alcalá (13 March 1924 – 17 May 2017) was a Mexican football goalkeeper who played for Mexico in the 1950 FIFA World Cup. Córdoba played for the 1951 Club Atlas squad that won the 1951 league championship. He also played for Club San Sebastián de León, Club Deportivo Oro, and Deportivo Toluca in his career. Córdoba died May 17, 2017, at the age of 93.

References

External links
FIFA profile

1930 births
2017 deaths
Sportspeople from León, Guanajuato
Footballers from Guanajuato
Association football goalkeepers
Mexican footballers
Mexico international footballers
1950 FIFA World Cup players
Liga MX players
CD Oro footballers
Deportivo Toluca F.C. players
Atlas F.C. footballers